Witcher may refer to:

 Witcher (surname), a surname
 Witcher Creek, a tributary of the Kanawha River in West Virginia, United States
 Witcher Holes Creek, a stream in the U.S. state of South Dakota

 Witcher, a fictional profession in Andrzej Sapkowski's fantasy series The Witcher, 1986
 Witcher, a translation of the word vedmak, a "male witch" in Slavic mythology

See also 
Wicher (disambiguation)
The Witcher (disambiguation)